Suave Veneno (English title: Mild Poison) is a Brazilian telenovela produced and aired on TV Globo from January 18 to September 18, 1999, at 8 pm, with a total of 209 chapters.

It was written by Aguinaldo Silva with the help of Angela Carneiro, Maria Helena Nascimento, Felipe Miguez, Fernando Rebello and Marilia Garcia. The telenovela was directed by Marcos Schechtman, Alexandre Avancini and Moacyr Goes with the general direction of Ricardo Waddington, Marcos Schechtman and core Ricardo Waddington and Daniel Filho.

It was played by TV Globo International in 2007 with a total of 140 chapters. There were 130 episodes of the version shown on Portuguese television.

Featured José Wilker, Glória Pires, Irene Ravache, Letícia Spiller, Patrícia França, Ângelo Antônio, Luana Piovani, Tarcísio Filho, Vanessa Lóes, Nívea Maria, Betty Faria and Rodrigo Santoro in lead roles in the plot.

Plot
The businessman Valdomiro Cerqueira hits a young woman named Inês with his car, causing her to lose her memory. Valdomiro is in debt to the girl, who is alone and can’t remember her past, and takes her to live in his house until the situation is stabilized. His family receives her coldly and with suspicion: his wife, Eleonor, and their three daughters, Maria Regina, Maria Antonia, and Márcia Eduarda. And what they feared ends up happening: Valdomiro’s involvement with Inês causes his  separation from Eleonor and the fury of Maria Regina, who sees Inês as an intruder and a threat to the family fortune. Maria Regina clashes with her father in a bitter struggle for power at “Marmoreal", a company founded and chaired by Valdomiro.

Cast

Awards and nominations

Troféu Imprensa
 Best Telenovela – Nomination
 Best Actress – Letícia Spiller – Nomination

Prêmio Extra de Televisão

 Best Actress – Letícia Spiller
 Revelation of the Year – Luiz Carlos Tourinho

References

External links
 Suave Veneno in "Memória Globo"  (in Portuguese)

1999 telenovelas
Brazilian telenovelas
TV Globo telenovelas
1999 Brazilian television series debuts
1999 Brazilian television series endings
Brazilian LGBT-related television shows
Portuguese-language telenovelas